John Affleck (12 February 1710 – 17 February 1776)  was a British Tory politician who sat in the House of Commons between 1743 and 1761.

Affleck was the second and eldest surviving son of Gilbert Affleck of Dalham Hall, Suffolk and his wife Anna Dolben, daughter of John Dolben. His younger brother was Sir Edmund Affleck, 1st Baronet. He was educated at Westminster School (1722), Christ Church, Oxford (1727) and studied law at the Inner Temple (1728).

In 1743, Affleck was returned as Member of Parliament for Suffolk representing the constituency until 1761.  Between 1767 and 1768, he sat also as Member of Parliament (MP)  for Amersham.
 
In 1736 Affleck married Sarah Metcalfe, only daughter of James Metcalfe, and had by her 3 sons.
In 1764 he succeeded his father to Dalham Hall, near Bury St Edmunds, Suffolk.

References

1710 births
1776 deaths
People educated at Westminster School, London
Alumni of Christ Church, Oxford
Members of the Inner Temple
Members of the Parliament of Great Britain for English constituencies
Tory MPs (pre-1834)
British MPs 1741–1747
British MPs 1747–1754
British MPs 1754–1761
British MPs 1761–1768